The Peixe River (Itapicuru River) is a river in Bahia state in eastern Brazil. It is a tributary of the Itapicuru River in the municipality of Queimadas.

See also
List of rivers of Bahia

References

Rivers of Bahia